Leonard I. Garth (April 7, 1921 – September 22, 2016) was a United States circuit judge of the United States Court of Appeals for the Third Circuit and previously was a United States district judge of the United States District Court for the District of New Jersey.

Education and career

Garth was born in Brooklyn, New York, and graduated with a Bachelor of Arts degree from Columbia University in 1942. He served during World War II as a United States Army Lieutenant from 1943 to 1946. Upon his return, he received his Bachelor of Laws from Harvard Law School in 1952, and built a private practice in Paterson, New Jersey.

Federal judicial service

On July 22, 1969, Garth was nominated by President Richard Nixon to a seat on the United States District Court for the District of New Jersey vacated by Judge Thomas M. Madden. Garth was confirmed by the United States Senate on December 17, 1969, and received his commission on December 18, 1969. His service terminated on August 29, 1973, due to his elevation to the Third Circuit.

On July 19, 1973, President Nixon nominated Garth to a seat on the United States Court of Appeals for the Third Circuit vacated by Judge James Rosen. Garth was confirmed by the Senate on August 3, 1973, and received his commission on August 6, 1973. He assumed senior status on June 30, 1986, serving in that status until his death on September 22, 2016.

Concurrent with his federal court service, Garth was a lecturer at Rutgers Law School starting in 1978 and at Seton Hall University School of Law starting in 1980.

Notable case

Garth wrote the opinion in Sullivan v. Barnett, 139 F.3d 158 (3d Cir. 1998). This decision was reversed by the United States Supreme Court in American Manufacturers Mutual Insurance Company v. Sullivan, 526 U.S. 40 (1999).

Notable clerks

Supreme Court Justice Samuel Alito clerked for Garth from 1976 to 1977 in his first job out of law school.  Law professors who clerked for Judge Garth include former Co-Dean Ronald Chen of Rutgers Law School, Orin Kerr of USC Gould School of Law, Norman I. Silber of Hofstra Law School (and Research Scholar at Yale Law School), and Louis Virelli of Stetson Law School.  Harvey Rishikof is Professor of Law and National Security Studies at the National War College and previously the Dean of Roger Williams University School of Law.

Personal life
In 1942, he married Sarah Kaufman, and they had a daughter.

See also
 List of Jewish American jurists

References

External links
 

1921 births
2016 deaths
United States Army personnel of World War II
Military personnel from New York City
Columbia College (New York) alumni
Harvard Law School alumni
Judges of the United States Court of Appeals for the Third Circuit
Judges of the United States District Court for the District of New Jersey
People from Brooklyn
People from Paterson, New Jersey
Rutgers University faculty
Seton Hall University School of Law faculty
United States court of appeals judges appointed by Richard Nixon
20th-century American judges
United States district court judges appointed by Richard Nixon
United States Army officers